Bois-l'Évêque is a commune in the Seine-Maritime department in the Normandy region in northern France.

Geography

Population

Places of interest
 The church of Notre-Dame, dating from the nineteenth century.
 Remnants of the 13th-century priory de Beaulieu.
 The nineteenth century Château de Bethel.
 Ruins of a 13th-century chapel.

See also
Communes of the Seine-Maritime department

References

Communes of Seine-Maritime